The UK Indie Chart is a weekly chart that ranks the biggest-selling singles that are released on independent record labels in the United Kingdom. It is compiled by the Official Charts Company and is based on both physical and digital single sales. In 2009, the chart was published in the UK magazines ChartsPlus and Music Week, on BBC Radio 1's website and, from October, on the Official Charts Company's website. During the year, 20 singles reached number one.

The chart was significantly revamped in June 2009. Since the inception of the UK Indie Chart in 1980, the definition of whether or not a single was "indie" had depended on the distribution channel by which it was shipped—the record needed to be delivered by a distribution service that was independent of the four major record companies: EMI, Sony Music Entertainment, Warner Music Group and Universal Music Group. The new system altered the qualification criteria to include only singles from labels that were at least fifty per cent owned by a record company that was not one of the main four. This prevented major record companies from qualifying for the chart by outsourcing the shipping of their singles to smaller distribution services. These new changes were first unveiled at the 2008 annual general meeting of the British Phonographic Industry on 9 July, and the new chart went live on 29 June 2009. The first song to top the chart under the new system was "Bonkers" by Dizzee Rascal.

"Bonkers" spent seven consecutive weeks at the top of the UK Indie Chart in 2009, making it the longest-running indie number one of the year; it was the longest-running number one since Dizzee's previous single, "Dance Wiv Me", which spent nine weeks at the top in 2008. "Bonkers" was also the biggest-selling indie hit of the year, selling more than 480,000 copies and topping the official UK Singles Chart. Other high-selling indie tracks included Dizzee's "Holiday", which sold almost 280,000 singles and topped the UK Singles Chart, and "Sweet Disposition" by The Temper Trap, which sold nearly 220,000 copies and made the UK Top Ten for two weeks. Dizzee was the only act to have more than one single reach number one—namely "Bonkers", "Holiday" and "Dirtee Cash"—and his songs were at the top for a total of 13 weeks.

Chart-topping singles from the 2009 UK Indie Chart also included a new adaptation of "The Fields of Anfield Road", which was released by Liverpool Collective to commemorate the twentieth anniversary of the Hillsborough disaster, and "The Haggis", a charity record released by students of Alva Academy in aid of Comic Relief. Swedish singer Victoria Bergsman topped the chart under the pseudonym Taken by Trees, after her cover version of "Sweet Child o' Mine" by Guns N' Roses was used in an advert for the UK department store John Lewis.

Chart history

See also
List of number-one singles of 2009 (UK)
List of UK Dance Chart number-one singles of 2009
List of UK Indie Chart number-one albums of 2009
List of UK Official Download Chart number-one singles of 2009
List of UK Rock Chart number-one singles of 2009
List of UK R&B Chart number-one singles of 2009

References
General

Specific

External links
Independent Singles Chart at the Official Charts Company
UK Top 30 Indie Singles Chart at BBC Radio 1

Indie 2009
2009 in British music
UK Indie Singles